Yeonhwasan may refer to:

Yeonhwasan (Ulsan), mountain in Ulju County, Ulsan, South Korea
Yeonhwasan (South Gyeongsang), mountain in Goseong County, South Gyeongsang, South Korea

See also
Lianhuashan (disambiguation)